The geology of Abkhazia includes Neogene molasse deposits which are common along the coast. Paleogene greywacke and siltstone rocks run in a belt inshore into Georgia, while much of the northern and central areas of the country are underlain by Cretaceous and Jurassic rocks. The entire country is underlain by the suture left by the closing the Paleotethys Ocean. The region has asymmetric, isoclinal folding.

References

Geology
Abkhazia
Abkhazia
Geology of Asia by country
Geology of Europe by country
Geology by country